Tomasz Holc (born 4 June 1947) is a Polish sailor. He competed iat the 1972 Summer Olympics and the 1980 Summer Olympics.

References

External links
 

1947 births
Living people
Polish male sailors (sport)
Olympic sailors of Poland
Sailors at the 1972 Summer Olympics – Tempest
Sailors at the 1980 Summer Olympics – Star
Sportspeople from Warsaw